This article is a list of music plates in Rees's Cyclopaedia. They were written by Charles Burney (1726–1814), with additional material by John Farey, sr (1766–1826), and John Farey, Jr (1791–1851). There are 53 plates as well a numerous examples of music typeset.

Music plates
Charles Burney was well known as the author of a General History of Music, 4 vol 1776–1789 and two travel diaries recording his Musical Tours collecting information in France and Italy, and later Germany, 1+2 vol, 1771 and 1773, as well as the Commemoration of Handel, 1785 and his Musical Memoirs of Metastasio, 1796. John Farey, sr was a polymath, well known today for his work as a geologist and for his investigations of the mathematics of sound, and the schemes of temperament used in tuning musical instruments then. His son, John Farey, jr, was also polymathic in his interests. He contributed numerous drawings for the illustrations of mostly technological and scientific topics in Rees's Cyclopaedia.

The index to plates in Vol 39 of the work notes that plates XXXIV — XLIV were intended to include selections from the works of Haydn and Mozart, and also various National Airs. Since they were readily accessible elsewhere they were omitted to save expense. Plate XLV was also omitted.

Wilson Lowry engraved a number of the general plates in Miscellany and with John Farey Jr, the draughtsman, those on the Hawkins's Claviole and the set on the Organ. The examples of music notation in the Music section must be presumed to have been originally written out by Burney, and were engraved by a Jno [John] Lee.  All the plates of musical instruments were also engraved by Lee. A number were drawn by a T. Webster. One was drawn by Edward Francesco Burney, Charles Burney's nephew, and another by an artist named Strange.

Vol III of plates Hydraulics — Naval Architecture

MISCELLANY

MUSIC

MUSICAL INSTRUMENTS

Vol IV of plates. Navigation — Writing by cipher

ORGAN

References

Music plates
Music-related lists